Odyssey High School was a high school located at 95 G St, South Boston, Massachusetts 02127. It is one third of the old South Boston High. 
It was then shut down, after they lost their head master.

It was then changed to be Boston Green Academy.

References

External links
Odyssey High School Overview at U.S. News

2011 disestablishments in Massachusetts
Defunct schools in Massachusetts
Educational institutions disestablished in 2011
Educational institutions in the United States with year of establishment missing
High schools in Boston
Public high schools in Massachusetts
South Boston